Farasan is the largest town of the Farasan Islands, in the Red Sea. Islands are a part of the Jizan Province, far south-western part of Saudi Arabia.

Climate

See also 

 List of cities and towns in Saudi Arabia
 Regions of Saudi Arabia

References

External links 

 Farasan Islands Website
 Photo of Farasan Island's antiquities
 Photo of Farasan Island's antiquities
 Photo of the beach on the Farasan Island
 Saudi Aramco World: Dreaming of Farasan
 Protected Areas in the Arab World
 Farasan Island, a diver's paradise, Splendid Arabia: A travel site with photos and routes

Populated places in Jizan Province